The Critics' Choice Movie Award for Best Score (previously known as the Critics' Choice Award for Best Composer) is one of the Critics' Choice Movie Awards given to people working in the film industry by the Critics Choice Association. It was first given out as a juried award from 1999 to 2001 and then competitively in 2002 onward.

Winners and nominees

1990s

2000s

2010s

2020s

Multiple winners
4 wins
 John Williams

3 wins
 Howard Shore (2 consecutive)

2 wins
 Hildur Guðnadóttir
 Justin Hurwitz
 Trent Reznor
 Atticus Ross
 Hans Zimmer

Multiple nominations (3 or more)
11 nominations
 Alexandre Desplat

10 nominations
 Hans Zimmer

8 nominations
 John Williams

7 nominations
 Howard Shore

5 nominations
 Jonny Greenwood

4 nominations
 Trent Reznor
 Atticus Ross

3 nominations
 Nicholas Britell
 Carter Burwell
 Clint Eastwood
 Michael Giacchino
 Hildur Guðnadóttir
 Justin Hurwitz
 Jóhann Jóhannsson
 Thomas Newman

See also
 BAFTA Award for Best Original Music
 Academy Award for Best Original Score
 Golden Globe Award for Best Original Score
 Grammy Award for Best Score Soundtrack for Visual Media
 Grammy Award for Best Compilation Soundtrack for Visual Media

References

S
Film music awards
Awards established in 1999